Kuthethurshri Vasudevadas (born 26 January 1985) is an Indian first class cricketer. He is a left-hand batsman and a leg-break bowler. He plays for Tamil Nadu. He made his list-A debut on 8 February 2004 against Rajasthan in which he did not get to bat. He made his first-class debut on 14–17 February against England A squad in which he scored 98. He was signed by the Chennai Super Kings in 2011. But he is yet to play a match for them.

References

1985 births
Living people
Indian cricketers
Sebastianites Cricket and Athletic Club cricketers
Tamil Nadu cricketers
Badureliya Sports Club cricketers

Chennai Super Kings cricketers